Three ships of the Royal Navy have borne the name HMS Research. A fourth was planned and launched, but never entered service:

  was a tender purchased in 1846 and broken up in 1859.
  was an ironclad screw sloop built as HMS Trent but renamed in 1862 and launched in 1863. She was sold in 1884.
  was a paddle survey vessel built as HMS Investigator but renamed in 1887 and launched in 1888. She was sold in 1920.
 HMS Research was to have been a survey vessel. She was launched in 1939 but was not completed, and was scrapped in 1952.

Royal Navy ship names